Rita von Gaudecker (born Rita von Blittersdorf: 14 April 1879 – 18 March 1968) was a German author who produced many books for children and young people, also contributing on religious topics.   She also became engaged in social work, founding the "Helferbund Rita von Gaudecker" welfare support organisation in 1945.

Life 
Rita Margarethe Klara Alexandra von Blittersdorf was born, the eighth of her parents' nine recorded children, in Molstow, a village near Greifenberg (as it was called before the ethnic cleansing of 1944/45) in East Pomermania.   Her father,  Carl Freiherr von Blittersdorf, was a minor aristocrat.   Her mother, Ada Freiin von Behr, died from scarlet fever in March 1885, when she was not quite six.   Her father never recovered from the blow, but she and her siblings nevertheless had a happy childhood.  Looking back, she would later write:  "What a truly untroubled existence a rural child has.   Alongside the villagers, all the farm animals and the whole of nature.  Gathering the unknowing powers of all these.   Powers to defend and to transgress."

Her Confirmation was followed by years as a "house daughter". Till 1906, when her youngest sister married, she took responsibility for running the household. Along with this, in 1914 she took charge of the "Kapellenverein Youth Association", also running its magazine, "Wir "ollen Helfen!" ("We want to help!"). From these beginnings, she occupied herself ever more as a writer, especially for children and young people. Her autobiographical children's book "Unter der Molstower Linde" ("Under the Molstow Linden Tree"), published in 1920, became a great success, and was still in print in the 1960s. Her religious works for children and Confirmation candidates also enjoyed great respect. These included "Weißt du, wieviel Sternlein stehen? Fünfzig Kinderandachten" ("Do you know how many little stars there are?  50 children's devotions"), based on "Weißt du, wieviel Sternlein stehen" and published in 1930, "So nimm denn meine Hände. Fünfzig Kinderandachten" ("So take my hands:  fifty children's devotions"), based on "So nimm denn meine Hände" and published in 1933 and "Jesu, geh voran! Fünfzig Kinderandachten" ("Go forth Jesus:  fifty children's devotions"), based on "Jesu, geh voran" and published in 1936. The Kapellenverein had been concerning itself with child labour, and taking care of homeless and abusively treated children.

On 13 April 1914 Rita von Blittersdorf married the naval officer Gerhard Jobst August Moritz von Gaudecker.   The marriage remained childless.   After being stationed successively in Kiel, Constantinople and Wilhelmshaven the couple moved back to Pomerania.   Here Rita von Gaudecker looked after what became a small network of several orphanages operated under the auspices of the Kapellenverein, the first of which had been relocated from Berlin to Kolberger Deep during the winter of 1916/17.   A second was established in 1920/21 to look after the children of officers who had been killed in the recent war.   Rita von Gaudecker was also in charge of a children's home in a house bequeathed to the Kapellenverein along Park Street Kolberg, where the focus was on children from villages who needed to be in the town in order to be able to attend school.   For the younger children the establishment ran its own school under the direction of Rita von Gaudecker, helped by mostly young volunteers from the Christian organisation.   Fund raising was a constant preoccupation, which she achieved both by personal visits to individual groups and using circular letters.   Captain von Gaudecker kept the accounts.

The change of government in January 1933 heralded a rapid and ultimately disastrous transition to a one-party dictatorship in Germany.   It was far from easy to continue as before with the private running of a Christian children's home, with a shared Christian focus and frequent regular Christian worship.   There was one senior Nazi who had once been a young helper at the home who was able to provide a level of protection.   Nevertheless, the older children were obliged to join the Hitler Youth and then, following the outbreak in 1939 of another war, to become soldiers.   Many came back from the front to spend any periods of army leave at Deep, but by the time the war ended, formally in May 1945, many had been killed in the fighting.   At the start of 1945, with ethnic cleansing underway in the east, the children were able to escape to Mecklenburg.   They were then sent back, however, and survived for a few more months in Deep, which was now being inundated with refugees being forced out of Eastern Germany in order to make space for Polish refugees being forced out of what had previously been eastern Poland.   In Deep, as the Soviet armies over-ran the region, the dangers facing the von Gaudeckers, now in their mid-sixties, were doubled on account of their aristocratic provenance (and name) and because Captain von Gaudecker was a retired army officer.   They fled or were expelled from Deep and until October 1945 survived hunger and sickness in the Berlin suburb of Treptow.

From Berlin they moved to Holstein where they stayed till 1950 when they moved to stay with distant relatives on the other sid3e of the country, in Allmendingen (south of Ulm).   Here Captain von Gaudecker, who had been in poor health for some time, died in 1954, while Rita was hospitalised with a broken hip, after which she was never again able to use stairs.   Meanwhile, she had already, in 1945, founded the "Helferbund vom Kapellenverein", dedicated to the causes for which she had always worked, and while there were no longer children's homes, she had still been able to organise food parcels.   After becoming immobilised in 1954 she seldom left her "large room in the tower" at her relatives' property in Allmendingen, but she remained energetic with her pen.   In 1965 she finally retired from her chairmanship of the Helferbund which shortly afterwards was renamed as the "Verein in Helferbund Rita von Gaudecker e. V.", the name under which it still exists.

Rita von Gaudecker died at the hospital in Ehingen, a couple of miles to the south of Allmendingen, on 18 March 1968.

Published output 
 (not necessarily a complete list)

 Unter der Molstower Linde. Braunschweig 1920
 Vom Prinzeßchen, das nicht einschlafen konnte. Braunschweig 1921
 Breit aus die Flügel beide! Fünfzig Kinderandachten. Potsdam 1927
 Die Brücke. Stuttgart 1930
 Vom Fischerdorf zur Ottenburg. Potsdam 1931
 Der Weg zur Marie. Hamburg 1932
 So nimm denn meine Hände. Fünfzig Kinderandachten. Potsdam 1933
 Der Weihnachtsgast. Hamburg 1936
 Jesu geh voran! Fünfzig Kinderandachten. Potsdam 1936
 Der Onkel aus Holland. Schwerin 1937
 An nuer Küste. Hamburg 1938
 Nacht am Berg. Gütersloh 1947
 Die alte Laterne. Bielefeld 1954
 Auf Gottes Acker. Bielefeld 1963

Honour 
 1964 Order of Merit of the Federal Republic of Germany

References 

People from Gryfice
People from Pomerania
People from Ehingen
Officers Crosses of the Order of Merit of the Federal Republic of Germany
20th-century German women writers
German children's writers
German women children's writers
1879 births
1968 deaths